Pauline Dreyfus (19 November 1969) is a French woman of letters, winner of the prix des Deux Magots in January 2013 for her novel . That was the first time the prize was awarded unanimously by the jury.

Works 
 
 
  - prix des Deux Magots, 2013.
 Ce sont des choses qui arrivent, Paris, Éditions Grasset et Fasquelle, 2014  -  prix Mémoire Albert Cohen 2015.

References

External links 
 Pauline Dreyfus: tout va très bien Mme la duchesse
 La débâcle morale d'une France sens dessus dessous on RFI 

21st-century French non-fiction writers
French women novelists
Prix des Deux Magots winners
1969 births
Living people
21st-century French women writers